The Mysterious Mrs. M is a 1917 silent film drama directed by Lois Weber and starring Harrison Ford and Mary MacLaren. It was a Bluebird Pictures Production distributed by Universal Film Manufacturing Company.

Cast
Harrison Ford - Raymond Van Seer
Mary MacLaren - Phyllis Woodman
Evelyn Selbie - Mrs. Musslewhite
Willis Marks - Green
Frank Brownlee - Dr. Woodman
Bertram Grassby - Clubman
Charles Hill Mailes - Clubman
Arthur Forde - unknown role

Preservation status
The film survives in the Library of Congress incomplete. Reels 1 & 2 survive,  reels 3, 4 and 5 are lost.
Prints and/or fragments were found in the Dawson Film Find in 1978.

References

External links
 The Mysterious Mrs. M at IMDb.com

1917 films
Films directed by Lois Weber
American silent feature films
American black-and-white films
Universal Pictures films
Silent American drama films
1917 drama films
1910s American films